Khoshkin-e Kumasi (also Romanized as Khoshkīn-e Kūmāsī; also known as Khoshgīn, Khoshkīn, Vashkīn, Veshkīn, and Wiskīn) is a village in Kalatrazan Rural District, Kalatrazan District, Sanandaj County, Kurdistan Province, Iran. At the 2006 census, its population was 277, in 59 families. The village is populated by Kurds.

References 

Towns and villages in Sanandaj County
Kurdish settlements in Kurdistan Province